Populars in Freedom Party (PPL) was a political party in the Spanish city of Melilla. The party was created in March 2011 by former Mayor-President of Melilla Ignacio Velázquez Rivera as a split from the People's Party (PP). In November 2016 the party was dissolved and merged into the PP.

References

2011 establishments in Spain
2016 disestablishments in Spain
Political parties established in 2011
Political parties disestablished in 2016
Political parties in Melilla